Utricularia foveolata is a small, probably annual, carnivorous plant that belongs to the genus Utricularia. It is native to the Old World tropics, where it can be found in Africa (Chad, Côte d'Ivoire, the Democratic Republic of the Congo, Ghana, Madagascar, Mali, Mozambique, Nigeria, Tanzania, Uganda, Zambia), Asia (China, India, the Philippines, Thailand), Australia, and on the eastern end of Java. U. foveolata grows as a terrestrial or subaquatic plant in wet soils or in shallow water, sometimes as a weed in rice fields in Asia. It was originally described and published by Michael Pakenham Edgeworth in 1847.

See also 
 List of Utricularia species

References 

foveolata
Carnivorous plants of Africa
Carnivorous plants of Asia
Carnivorous plants of Australia
Flora of Chad
Flora of China
Flora of Ivory Coast
Flora of Ghana
Flora of Madagascar
Flora of Mali
Flora of Mozambique
Flora of Nigeria
Flora of Queensland
Flora of Tanzania
Flora of the Democratic Republic of the Congo
Flora of tropical Asia
Flora of Uganda
Flora of Zambia